The following highways are numbered 419:

Canada
Manitoba Provincial Road 419
Newfoundland and Labrador Route 419

Japan
 Route 419 (Japan)

United States
 Florida:
  Florida State Road 419
  County Road 419 (Seminole County, Florida)
 County Road 419 (Osceola County, Florida)
  Georgia State Route 419 (unsigned designation for Interstate 985)
  New York State Route 419
 New York State Route 419 (former)
  Pennsylvania Route 419
  Puerto Rico Highway 419
  South Carolina Highway 419
  Virginia State Route 419